Showmaster may mean:

 Pseudo-anglicism for a TV show host
 Fender Showmaster, an electric guitar by Fender
 ShowMaster Whiteboard,a kind of upscale glass whiteboard